AVF formerly AV Formula, was a Spanish motor racing team, ran by former racing driver Adrián Vallés.

History
After retiring from racing, Vallés formed his own team at the end of 2012, under the name Av Formula. In October 2012 the team began by competing in the two final rounds of the Formula Renault 2.0 Alps, with  Tatiana Calderón, Denis Nagulin, Egor Orudzhev, Emanuele Zonzini as drivers. Zonzini brought the highest-place finish to the team on the thirteenth place. AV Formula took over the Team RFR's entry in Formula Renault 3.5 Series in 2013. The team signed Yann Cunha and Arthur Pic for their debut season in Formula Renault 3.5. AV Formula ended season with the ninth place in the teams' standings and a single podium at the home circuit Alcañiz scored by Pic. Also in 2013 the team decided to concentrate on the Formula Renault 2.0 NEC with Fran Rueda as regular driver.

Results

Formula Renault 3.5 Series

Formula V8 3.5

Eurocup Formula Renault 2.0

Formula Renault 2.0 NEC

References

External links 

 

Spanish auto racing teams
Auto racing teams established in 2012
2012 establishments in Spain
World Series Formula V8 3.5 teams
Formula Renault Eurocup teams
European Le Mans Series teams